This page is a list of former or demolished  theatres and other entertainment venues.  For currently operating theatres, see List of theatres and entertainment venues in Paris.

List

Bibliography 

  Philippe Chauveau, Les Théâtres parisiens disparus (1402–1986), Ed. de l'Amandier, Paris, 1999. .
  André Degaine, Histoire du théâtre dessinée et Guide des promenades théâtrales à Paris, Ed. Nizet, 1992–1999. .

Demolished
Demolished
 
Demolished entertainment venues in Paris
Paris, Demolished
Entertainment venues, demolished
Entertainment venues in Paris